Peter Wespi (March 22, 1943 – October 5, 2015) was a Swiss professional ice hockey player who represented the Swiss national team at the 1964 Winter Olympics.

References

1943 births
2015 deaths
Ice hockey players at the 1964 Winter Olympics
Olympic ice hockey players of Switzerland
ZSC Lions players